Sir Philip Bowes Vere Broke, 1st Baronet  (9 September 1776 – 2 January 1841) was a distinguished officer in the British Royal Navy. His most famous military achievement was defeating and capturing the American frigate, USS Chesapeake.

Early life 
Broke was born at Broke Hall, Nacton, near Ipswich, the eldest son of Philip Bowes Broke, grandson of Philip Broke and descendant of Sir Richard Broke, who served as Chief Baron of the Exchequer. He was educated at Ipswich School, where a house was later named in his honour.

Naval career
Broke joined the Royal Naval Academy at Portsmouth Dockyard in 1788, and began active service as a midshipman in 1792.  It was rather unusual for him to receive formal naval education – most of his contemporaries had only "on the job" training.  He served as third lieutenant on the frigate  during the battle of Cape St. Vincent in February 1797. He was promoted to commander in 1799 and captain on 14 February 1801.

On 25 November 1802, Broke married Sarah Louisa Middleton, daughter of Sir William Fowle Middleton 1st Baronet of Crowfield, Suffolk. They had 11 children, including Philip Broke, 2nd Baronet, George Broke-Middleton, and Charles Acton Broke.

Capture of USS Chesapeake

Broke took command of the Shannon, a 38-gun frigate, on 31 August 1806. Broke was ordered to Halifax, Nova Scotia, in 1811 as the diplomatic position between America and Britain deteriorated. The United States Congress declared war on 18 June 1812.

There were half a dozen naval battles between Royal Navy and United States Navy frigates in 1812 and the early months 1813. The Americans won every one of those six encounters, which came as a surprise to the Royal Navy. The British and American ships were of the same rate, yet they were not of the same size or power. In each case the American ships were larger than the British vessels, had larger crews and had a heavier broadside.  The Americans had a main battery of 24-pounder long guns compared with the smaller 18-pounders mounted on the British ships; the weight refers to the size of the cannonballs.

Matters changed when Shannon met Chesapeake off Boston, Massachusetts in a single ship action. Although Chesapeake was a slightly larger craft and had a substantially larger crew, the armament of the two ships was evenly matched. However, gunnery was Broke's area of expertise, and the crew of Shannon were exceptionally well drilled for the era.

At the time the official rating of a ship did not accurately reflect the number of cannon mounted. Thus HMS Shannon (1065 tons burthen) was classed as a 38 gun ship but mounted 48 guns in total. USS Chesapeake (1135 tons burthen) was variously rated a 36 or 38 gun ship but mounted 49 guns in total. Broke mounted a number of very small carronades in order that ships' boys and younger midshipmen could have cannon light enough for them to practise on. The force of a ship was usually calculated as "weight of metal." This was the aggregate of the weight of all the cannonballs capable of being fired in one broadside (i.e., when half of the cannon, all the guns on the same side, were fired). The British weight of metal was 547 pounds, the American weight of metal was 581 pounds. The two ships were very well matched with no preponderance of force on either side.

Chesapeake was disabled by gunfire, boarded and captured within 15 minutes of opening fire. Fifty-six sailors on Chesapeake were killed and eighty-five wounded including her captain James Lawrence, who died of his wounds on 4 June. Lawrence's last command was reported to be, "Don't give up the ship".  On the Shannon, 24 were killed and 59 wounded, including Broke who sustained a serious head wound while leading the boarding party. The head wound from a cutlass blow, which had exposed the brain, had been very severe accompanied by great blood loss. Therapeutic bleeding, routinely employed at the time, was not performed by Shannons surgeon Mr Alexander Jack, which was to Broke's advantage. The report of the surgeon described the wound as "a deep cut on the parietal bone, extending from the top of the head ... towards the left ear, [the bone] penetrated for at least three inches in length."

Lieutenant Provo Wallis, a Nova Scotian, took command of Shannon as the frigate and her prize returned to Halifax as surgeons worked to save Broke. In Halifax, Broke recovered at the Commissioner's residence in the Halifax Naval Yard.

Shannons victory created a sensation in both the United States and the United Kingdom, especially in the newspapers of the era. In recognition, Broke was created a baronet on 25 September 1813. He became a Knight Commander of the Order of the Bath on 3 January 1815. He was also awarded a Naval Gold Medal, one of only eight awarded for single ship actions between 1794 and 1816. While his wounds precluded further active service, Broke served as a naval gunnery specialist in the Royal Navy. He was promoted to rear admiral of the red on 22 July 1830.

His younger brother, Charles Broke, later Charles Broke Vere, joined the British Army. Charles served under the Duke of Wellington. He ended as a major general and was knighted.

He died on 2 January 1841 and is buried in Nacton in Suffolk with a monument sculpted by Thomas Denman.

References

External links 
 
 

1776 births
1841 deaths
Baronets in the Baronetage of the United Kingdom
Knights Commander of the Order of the Bath
People educated at Ipswich School
People from Nacton
Royal Navy rear admirals
Royal Navy personnel of the French Revolutionary Wars
Royal Navy personnel of the War of 1812
British people of the War of 1812
British military personnel of the War of 1812